Dirk de Villiers (26 July 1924 – 28 December 2009), was a South African filmmaker. Considered as the most prolific filmmaker and 'Godfather' in South African film industry, de Villiers has made several critically acclaim films in a career spanned for more than six decades.

Personal life
He was born on 26 July 1924 on the farm Villieria in Douglas, Northern Cape, South Africa in a family with five siblings. His mother died when he was four years old and father is a farmer who continued farming inherited from Cornelius Valkenburg de Villiers. After mother died, Dirk and his brother Niel were sent from aunt to aunt. He later grew up on the banks of the Vaal River where he went to several schools in Jagersfontein, Marquard and Bethlehem.

He was married to the actress Addy from 1950 until divorced in 1973. The couple had five children including Gys de Villiers. Gys is also a popular actor and playwright in South African cinema and theater. He had a relationship with Miems Swanepoel for few years since 1992.

On 24 December 2009, he suffered heart attack and rushed into Chris Barnard Memorial Hospital in Cape Town. However, he died on 28 December 2009 at the age of 89, due to lung infection and heart failure.

Career
In 1942, de Villiers started acting in many dramas for the Johannesburg Afrikaans Amateur Actors (JAATS). Then he founded National Theater Organization along with Schalk Theron. Along with drama, he studied mechanical engineering, where he later worked in the Cape Town harbor. Then he went to London for a course in marine engineering. After returning, he became a ship engineer.

He started film career as an actor with the film Kruger Millions directed by Ivan Hall. In the film, he played the role of a traitorous member of the Cavalier suicide commando. He also acted in the films, Kniediep, Kruger miljoene en Stadig oor die klippe.  Piet my niggie, Kavaliers. He directed his maiden feature film Jy Is My Liefling. The film starred Franz Marx in his first film role and Min Shaw. After the commercial success of the film, he made the blockbuster films, Die Geheim Van Nantes. The film is an adaptation of the famous Springbok Radio serial, starring the entire voice cast. In 1968 he made his first full-length film, You Are My Darling and established as a professional filmmaker.

In 1972, de Villiers made thriller movie My Broer Se Bril. Then in 1974, he directed two films Met Liefde Van Adele and The Virgin Goddess. Meanwhile in 1976, he made his first internationally acclaim movies Glenda and Die diamantjagters. In 1978, he made euthanasia-oriented drama titled Besluit om te sterf. Meanwhile, de Villiers founded Roodepoort Amateur Theater Organization (RATO). Some of his popular feature films include: Geheim van Nantes, Kalahari Harry, Die Spaanse Vlieg, Daan en Doors op die dieggins, My broer se bril, Tant Ralie se losieshuis, Die lewe sonder jou, Die drie Van der Merwes, Met liefde van Adéle, My naam is Dingetjie, Witblits en Peach Brandy, Dingetjie en Idi, Die wit sluier en Kaalgat tussen die daisies.

Apart from cinema, de Villiers also made popular television serials such as Arende, Meeulanders and Jantjie kom huis toe where the latter is considered as the first television series with a brown cast in South Africa. In 1990, he won the Artes Award for Best Director of a Dramatic Work for the serial Arende. The serial also won Artes Awards for Best Performance by an Actor in a Dramatic Work and for Best Contribution to Production Services. With numerous awards at local award festivals, Arende later distributed as Cape Rebel in 52 countries. De Villiers then made two more sequels to the serial as well.

Meanwhile, de Villiers moved to direct English films, such as The Snake Dancer, which was based on the life of the famous stripper Glenda Kemp. Kemp herself played the lead role in the film. In the English film That English Woman, de Villiers discussed on the life of Emily Hobhouse and then in Abakoshobezi on the life of a black physician returning to his homeland after qualification.

In 2008, de Villiers was honoured at the Klein Karoo Arts Festival for his contribution to the South African film industry. He has made 25 feature films and 13 documentaries. In 2010, he was posthumously honored by the South African Film and Television Industry (Safta) for his lifetime dedication and contribution towards South African cinema.

Filmography

References

External links
 

1924 births
2009 deaths
South African film directors
South African film producers